Monte Petrella is the highest peak in the Aurunci Mountains, in southern Lazio, central Italy.

It can be reached from Spigno Saturnia from east, and Maranola, a frazione of Formia, from west.

External links 
 Peakbagger.com: Monte Petrella, Italy (Retrieved on October 14, 2008.)

Petrella